East Troy is a village in the town of Troy, Waldo County, Maine, United States.

Notes

Villages in Waldo County, Maine
Villages in Maine